John D. Weeks is an American chemist currently University Distinguished Professor at University of Maryland and an Elected Fellow of the American Association for the Advancement of Science and American Academy of Arts and Sciences.  He has degrees from Harvard College and the University of Chicago.

References

Year of birth missing (living people)
Living people
Fellows of the American Association for the Advancement of Science
Fellows of the American Academy of Arts and Sciences
21st-century American chemists
University of Maryland, College Park faculty
Members of the United States National Academy of Sciences
Harvard College alumni
University of Chicago alumni